École acadienne de Truro is a Canadian francophone public school in Truro, Nova Scotia. It is operated by Conseil scolaire acadien provincial. Created in 1997, the École acadienne de Truro was the first francophone public school in central Nova Scotia.

External links

 École acadienne de Truro 

Middle schools in Nova Scotia
High schools in Nova Scotia
Truro, Nova Scotia